Villa Massei is a 16th-century hunting lodge and 60 acres estate in Massa Macinaia, near the ancient walled city of Lucca, Italy, known for its fine gardens, which are visited by hundreds of garden lovers from all over the world annually.

The house was built by the Counts Sinibaldi in about 1500, and was inherited by the Marchesi Massei in the 18th century, nephews of the Sinibaldi. In the 1950s the property was home to Lionel Fielden, founder of All India Radio and author of The Natural Bent. In 1981 Gil Cohen and Paul Gervais, both of Boston, bought the estate, and over the years have developed its garden, which "represents the best of old and new, an 'exquisite recreation' of a Renaissance garden, complete with lemon trees in terracotta pots, and inspired innovations introduced by its visionary new owners." Gervais and Cohen sold the property to the TenCate family of The Netherlands in 2014.

Bibliography

 A Garden in Lucca, Paul Gervais, Hyperion 2000, New York
 Un Giardino a Lucca: la storia illustrata, Paul Gervais, Idea Books 2007, Viareggio/Milano
 Gardens of Florence and Tuscany, Mariachiara Pozzana, Giunti 2001, Prato
 Sun-Drenched Gardens, Jan Smithen, Harry N. Abrams, Inc. 2002, New York
 Gardens of Europe, Charles Quest-Ritson, Garden Art Press 2007, Woodbridge, Suffolk, England
 In Search of Paradise, Great Gardens of the World, Penelope Hobhouse, Frances Lincoln Limited 2006, London
 Italy's Private Gardens, Helena Attlee, Frances Lincoln Limited 2010, London
 The Best Gardens in Italy, Kristy McLeod, Frances Lincoln Limited 2011, London
 Dream Gardens, Tania Compton and Andrew Lawson, Merrell New York, London 2010

References

Further reading
 Le Rêve d'Italie, Marianne Niermans, Point de Vue, 30 Avril au 6 Mai 2013, pps 47-51
 Vila Na Koncu Alege, Stane Susnik, Roze & VRT, September 2011, pps 8-12
 En Drom i Toscana, Knut Langeland, Familien, 15 February 2010, pps 74-77
 A Garden in Lucca, Paul Gervais (reprinted from Architectural Digest) Tuscany Unlimited, September 2009, pps 62-65
 Toscanashire, Mariangela Rossi, Gulliver, Maggio 2009, p 39
 Sotto il Sole in Toscana, Nally Bellati, Grazia Casa, September 2008, pps 115-116
 Een speling van het lot, Cécile van der Heijden, De Tuin, Voorjaar 2008, pps 128- 135
 Un Americano a Lucca coltiva il gusto Toscano, Rosella Sleiter, Il Venerdì di Repubblica, 4 Aprile 2008, p 101
 Rinascita del Verde, Selvaggia Blu d'Aragona, La Rivista del Forte, Estate 2008, pps 52-55
 Il giardino ritrovato, Pia Pera, Gardenia, Maggio 2007, pps 81-87
 È il piu bel giardino dell'anno, LuccaIN, Estate 2007, pps 50-52
 Rinascimento Americano, Mariangela Rossi, Elle (Italia), Septembre 2006, pps 596-602
 Fascino ritrovato,  Silvia Tatozzi, Ville Giardini, Settembre 2006, pps 63-72
 Renaissance Men, Penelope Hobhouse, Gardens Illustrated, June 2004, 48-55
 A Garden in Lucca, Paul Gervais, Architectural Digest, March 2000, pps 84-88
 Planting Ideas, Paul Gervais, Food & Wine, June 2000, pps 46-47
 The Back Roads of Tuscany, Bill Sertle, Garden Design, October/November 1996, pps 72-81
 Mal d'Italia, Stefano Butti, Vogue (Italia),  Ottobre 1992
 Ritorno alle Origini, Giuseppe Chigiotti, Casa Vogue, Giugno 1992, pps 96-109
 Italian Hours, Paul Gervais, House & Garden, November 1991, pps 106-108
 Paul's Case, Alan, Friedman, Vanity Fair, December 1991

Villas in Lucca
Massei